Shahrak-e Namak Abrud (also Romanized as Shahrak-e Namak Âbrud; also known as Namak Abrood, Namak Âbrud, Namak Âbrud Sar, and Nur Sar) is a village in Kelarestaq-e Gharbi Rural District, in the Central District of Chalus County, Mazandaran Province, Iran. At the 2006 census, its population was 354, in 71 families.

Shahrak-e Namak Abrud is a touristic village and has an aerial tramway which starts at the sea level near the shores of the Caspian Sea and ends on the top of the Alborz heights crossing dense forest area of northern Iran. There are numerous villa cities around it which form a vacation region for the people of Tehran.

Located 12 km from East Chalus is new Namak Abroud township covering some 650 hectares, with the Caspian sea on its north and Madoban (the Alborz) on its south. Approximately 200 hectare violet and box-tree parks made the area very spectacular. Moreover, Madoban- the dense forest created a remarkably attractive landscape.
The original plan was designed by consulting engineer; Mr. Dazz, Mr. Charkhab, Mr.Hovard Homfari. Hovard Homfari's report said that Chalous-Ramsar Road bisected the area- with the northern side of the road dedicated to building villas, and Hite hotel and marinas suggested part and the related facility and apartment complex on its southern side.

References 

http://www.namakabrud.com

External links

 Pictures of Namak Abrood
 My own Trip to Namak Abrood
 Namakabrood pictures
 Gilara Estate - A gated community in Mazandaran, Iran

Populated places in Chalus County
Populated places on the Caspian Sea
Tourist attractions in Mazandaran Province